Lycaena helloides, the purplish copper, is a butterfly of the family Lycaenidae. It is found in North America from the Great Lakes area to British Columbia, south to Baja California.

The wingspan is 30–38 mm. The upper surface of the males is brown with a purple iridescence, while females are more orange. The hindwings of both males and females have a broad orange band at the margin. Adults are generally on wing from May to July and again from August to October in two generations per year, although up to four generations per year may occur at some locations. In the northern part of the range, there is one generation with adults on wing from July to August. Adults feed on flower nectar.

The larvae feed on the leaves of Polygonum, Rumex, and sometimes Potentilla species. The species overwinters as an egg.

References

Butterflies described in 1852
Lycaena
Lycaenidae of South America